Robert D. Hobert (born June 28, 1935) is a former Canadian football player who played for the Winnipeg Blue Bombers. He won the Grey Cup with them in 1958. He played college football at the University of Minnesota.

References

1935 births
Winnipeg Blue Bombers players
Living people